Carol Wright or Carroll Wright may refer to:
Carol Wright (The Only Way is Essex)
Carol Lynn Wright (born 1939), birthname of Carol Lynn Pearson, American Mormon writer
Carroll D. Wright (1840–1909), American statistician and first US Commissioner of Labor